Tsuen Wan Plaza is a private housing estate and shopping mall in Tsuen Wan, New Territories, Hong Kong, located near the MTR Tsuen Wan West station, Tsuen Wan Ferry Pier, Nina Tower, Skyline Plaza, Citywalk and Citywalk 2. It is one of the largest shopping malls in the district. Built on the reclaimed land of the old Tsuen Wan Ferry Pier, it was developed by Sun Hung Kai Properties in 1992. A large-scale renovation was completed from 2005 to 2009.

There are a wide variety of retail shops in the plaza, including a Yata department store replacing the former JUSCO which moved to the nearby Skyline Plaza. Tsuen Wan Plaza also has a variety of restaurants and leisure and entertainment facilities including a Broadway Circuit cinema and a  outdoor children's playground.

Politics
Tsuen Wan Plaza is located in Clague Garden constituency of the Tsuen Wan District Council. It was formerly represented by Chan Kim-kam, who was elected in the 2019 elections until July 2021.

References

External links

Official website of Tsuen Wan Plaza

Commercial buildings completed in 1992
Private housing estates in Hong Kong
Shopping centres in Hong Kong
Sun Hung Kai Properties
Tsuen Wan
Residential buildings completed in 1992